Ditshegwane is a village in Kweneng District of Botswana. It is located 15 km south-west of Letlhakeng. The population of Ditshegwane was 1,766 in 2001 census.

References

Kweneng District
Villages in Botswana